Longding district (Pron:/lɒŋˈdɪŋ/) is one of the 20 administrative districts of Arunachal Pradesh in northeastern India. It was carved out of the south-western portion of the Tirap District. The district shares its boundary to the south and south-east with the country of Myanmar. Its boundary to the west and the north are shared with the Indian states of Nagaland and Assam, respectively. Towards the north-east is the Tirap District from which the district was carved out in 2012.
The district has a population of around 60000 and an area of roughly 1200 square kilometers. Longding has a pleasant climate throughout the year. Due to its hilly terrain, the temperature ranges from 15C (in winter) to 30C in summers).

History 
The district has been historically inhabited by the Wancho people. With low productivity, the district was considered one of the most backward in the state. The creation of the new district was approved by the state cabinet on 7 August 2009, under the chairmanship of the then chief minister Dorjee Khandu.  The state government constituted a high-power committee on 23 June 2010, for finalizing the district boundary. According to the report submitted by high power committee on 11 August 2011, the Longding District was created on 26 September 2011 bypassing The Arunachal Pradesh Bill 2011 by voice-vote. The district was formally inaugurated on 19 March 2012 by chief minister Nabam Tuki.

Divisions
The district consists of six subdivisions or circles: Longding, Kanubari, Pongchau, Wakka, Pumao and Lawnu.  It includes the villages of Longphong, Nianu, Niausa, Senua, Senua Noksa, Zedua, Nginu, Ngissa, Mintong, Chanu, Longchan, Chubam, Russa and Rangluwa.

Demographics

The district has a population of 56,953 as of 2011. The district is inhabited mainly by the Wancho people. They are culturally similar to the Naga people. They practice gun making, wood carving, and bead making. They follow a type of Slash-and-burn cultivation known as the Jhum cultivation. Still many people follow Animism though a few have converted to Christianity.

Religion

References

External links
 Official website

 
Districts of Arunachal Pradesh
Minority Concentrated Districts in India
2012 establishments in Arunachal Pradesh